Psi is a DC character created by Paul Kupperberg and Carmine Infantino for The Daring New Adventures of Supergirl #1 (November 1982).

Fictional character biography

Pre-Crisis
Her real name is Gayle Marsh. At the age of twelve, she developed psychic powers, primarily psychokinesis. After her  parents died she was raised by the scientist David Pendergast who was preparing to fight a new menace called "the Decay". In college, she took the alias of Psi and fought Supergirl several times, thinking that Supergirl was the Decay. The truth was that David Pendergast was an extension of her own fears. Realizing that the Decay was David and herself, she put a stop to Pendergast and herself.

Post-Crisis
Psi’s first appearance in the Post Crisis DC Universe was with the Suicide Squad. She had no memory of her real name or history, as an unknown event "has nearly shattered her psyche".

She joined in order to gain help from the Suicide Squad in restoring her lost memory and accompanied Rick Flag and a similarly untested team for a mission in Central America, but she was killed by the Rocket Red Brigade. As she lay dying, she remembers her real name, Gayle Marsh, as well as her mother and father. Her allies, Mister 104, the Thinker and the Weasel are also killed on the mission.

During the events of Blackest Night, Psi's corpse is reanimated as a member of the Black Lantern Corps alongside several other fallen Suicide Squad members. Psi is apparently destroyed by the Manhunter's self-destruct mechanism unleashing an explosion of Green Lantern energy that eradicates the Black Lanterns.

The New 52
In September 2011, The New 52 rebooted DC's continuity. Psi is reintroduced as a prisoner in "The Circus", the Detroit station for A.R.G.U.S. operations. Steve Trevor and Killer Frost visit her cell to see if she can disrupt the Firestorm Matrix in order to free the imprisoned Justice Leagues. When Psi touches him however, Trevor is flooded with images, which he realizes connects everything he already knew, based on the clue Madame Xanadu told him, and tells him how to save the Justice League. One of the visions that Psi showed Steve Trevor was that Wonder Woman's lasso is in the possession of Cheetah.

Other versions
Psi appeared in the digital first comic book Adventures of Supergirl series. This version of Psi was a Kryptonian psychic who was an employee of Fort Rozz prison, working as its "dream mistress", controlling the dreams of its prisoners in order to secure their mental health. She lost her physical form when Fort Rozz crashed, and was manipulated by a villainess named Facet Jens into becoming an enemy of Supergirl, though eventually she was redeemed once Facet's true intentions were revealed.

In other media
Psi appears in the episode "Triggers" of the third season of Supergirl, portrayed by Yael Grobglas. Her primary psychic ability is to trigger incapacitating fear in others, either by making them relive a traumatic event or confronting a fearsome element. Nicknamed "Psi" by authorities, Gayle Marsh was "a law-abiding citizen of Skokie, Illinois" until she "snapped" and began robbing banks. Supergirl tries several times to apprehend Psi, but the criminal stops her by making her relive the trauma of being sent away from Krypton just before it exploded and being lost in the Phantom Zone. Supergirl ultimately manages to overcome her fears enough to resist Psi's attacks and capture her. Psi makes a return in "Fort Rozz" where she, along with Saturn Girl and Livewire, is recruited by Supergirl for a team to infiltrate the Kryptonian prison Fort Rozz to gain information on Reign. During the mission, she inadvertently uses powers on Saturn Girl after a blow to the head. Psi later saves Supergirl from Reign using her powers after Livewire sacrifices herself to save Supergirl. After returning to Earth Psi gives Supergirl her condolences for Live Wire's death. Supergirl in return asks that Psi be given a better room during her incarceration which prompts Psi to smile at her. In the episode "Alex in Wonderland", Alex in her virtual reality experience as Supergirl has an offscreen fight with Psi. She is arrested by the D.E.O. even though Psi's face isn't shown.

References

Characters created by Carmine Infantino
Characters created by Paul Kupperberg
Comics characters introduced in 1982
DC Comics female supervillains
DC Comics metahumans
DC Comics telekinetics 
DC Comics telepaths
Fictional characters with energy-manipulation abilities